Velo d'Astico is a town in the province of Vicenza, Veneto, Italy. It is west of SP350 provincial road.

Sources

(Google Maps)

Cities and towns in Veneto